Rudis Alberto Corrales Rivera (born November 6, 1979) is a retired Salvadoran footballer.

Club career
Corrales' professional career began in 1997, when he signed a contract with Municipal Limeño. He officially made his debut that same year on November 29, in a league match against Dragón.

On September 9, 2007 in a league match against Alianza F.C. Corrales became only the seventh person is Salvadoran league history to score 100 goals, a feat which has only been matched by Salvadoran greats Raúl Díaz Arce, Williams Reyes, Emiliano Pedrozo, Adonai Martínez, Hugo Coria and David Arnoldo Cabrera.

On December 19, 2010, it was announced that he signed a two year contract with Alianza.
In January 2012, Corrales joined Dragón. In April 2012 he suffered a stroke which partially paralyzed his face.

He played with CD Aguiluchos USA in Oakland, CA. He scored on a free kick in the 90th minute 15.03.14 to win the match a US Open Cup Qualifier.

International career
Corrales made his debut for El Salvador in a May 2001 UNCAF Nations Cup match against Nicaragua and has, as of December 2010, earned a total of 71 caps, scoring 16 goals. He represented his country in 20 FIFA World Cup qualification matches and played at the 2001, 2003, 2005 and 2009 UNCAF Nations Cups as well as at the 2002, 2003 and 2009 CONCACAF Gold Cups.

On February 6, 2008 in a FIFA World Cup qualification match against Anguilla, Corrales became the first player in Salvadoran history to score five goals in a World Cup qualifier. The previous record was held by legendary Salvadoran striker Raúl Díaz Arce, who had scored four goals against Saint Vincent and the Grenadines in the 2002 World Cup qualifiers.
He made his most memorable goal on a FIFA World Cup qualification match against Costa Rica on September 9, 2009. Scoring a goal at the 90th minute that gave life back to El Salvador in this Qualification Stage.

International goals
Scores and results list El Salvador's goal tally first.

References

External links
 
 Profile - El Gráfico 

1979 births
Living people
People from Morazán Department
Association football forwards
El Salvador international footballers
Salvadoran footballers
2001 UNCAF Nations Cup players
2002 CONCACAF Gold Cup players
2003 UNCAF Nations Cup players
2003 CONCACAF Gold Cup players
2005 UNCAF Nations Cup players
2009 UNCAF Nations Cup players
2009 CONCACAF Gold Cup players
2011 CONCACAF Gold Cup players
C.D. Águila footballers
Alianza F.C. footballers